This list includes properties and districts listed on the California Historical Landmark listing in Monterey County, California, United States. Click the "Map of all coordinates" link to the right to view an online map of all properties and districts with latitude and longitude coordinates in the table below.

|}

See also
List of California Historical Landmarks
National Register of Historic Places listings in Monterey County, California

References

External links

 California Historical Landmarks: Monterey County

List of California Historical Landmarks
H01
H01